"L'amour toujours" (also named "I'll Fly with You") is a song co-written and recorded by the Italian DJ Gigi D'Agostino. The song was released to American clubs and dance radio in July 2000. In Europe, the song was released in October 2000. The song is from D'Agostino's 1999 album of the same name. Ola Onabule is the vocalist of this song. He performs all the vocals on the track and on all versions of the song. It became an international success and a huge hit throughout Europe, Latin America, Asia and Canada. In 2001, the song became extremely popular in the American dance club scene, peaking at number 78 on the Billboard Hot 100 on 15 September 2001. The album version has a different mix, which was used as the single version in the United States except with vocal samples from "Bla Bla Bla" added.

Name
The title "L'amour toujours" translates to "love always" in French. However, the song is recorded entirely in English, and the title does not appear in the lyrics.

Track listing
Europe CD maxi (2001)
 "L'Amour Toujours" (L'Amour version) – 6:56
 "Un Giorno Credi" (gigidagostino.com) – 8:07
 "L'Amour Toujours" (gigidagostino.com) – 7:58
 "Musikakeparla" – 6:55

Music video
The music video for the song contains footage taken from live performances of D'Agostino performing throughout Europe at rave parties. The version used in the music video is called "Small Mix" and is the last four minutes of the album version.

In popular culture

 Finnish Big Brother contestant Tero Savikuja mentioned "L'amour toujours" as his favourite song when he attended the TV show, and it was played several times in the Big Brother house during that season. There is also a locally popular Finnish version of the song on YouTube called "Seppo on bi", which translates as "Seppo is a bisexual", alluding to a popular Finnish drama series Salatut elämät and its protagonist Seppo Taalasmaa. The name probably derives from its rhythmical uniformity with the song's distinctive synthesizer riff.
 D'Agostino is credited in "Fly With U", a song by Far East Movement from their album Dirty Bass, which contains some elements of "L'amour toujours".
 The instrumental of this song is heavily sampled on "Dream on the Dancefloor" by Basshunter, featured in his album Calling Time.
 In September 2015, Tiësto released a new edit of "L'amour toujours" performed by Dzeko & Torres, featuring vocals by Delaney Jane.
 Brazilian singer Clarice Falcão released an alternative rock cover of this song in her 2016 album Problema Meu.
 YouTuber PewDiePie used the song in an intro for his popular Meme Review series.
 In 2018 the hookline of the song was used for a remix of "In My Mind" by Lithuanian DJ Dynoro, which became a no. 1 hit in Germany, Hungary, Poland, Romania, Russia and Sweden.
 The song is featured throughout the ending credits of the 2019 crime thriller film Uncut Gems.
 The ending of the song is played after every goal that Wolverhampton Wanderers score at Molineux Stadium since 2020.
 AC Milan supporters use the song as a chant for football player Tiémoué Bakayoko
 Everton FC fans use the song a chant for defender Lucas Digne
 In 2022 the hookline of the song was used by Swedish rapper Yung Lean in Thaiboy Digital's single True Love.

Charts

Weekly charts

Year-end charts

Decade-end charts

Certifications

See also
List of Romanian Top 100 number ones

References

1999 songs
2001 singles
Gigi D'Agostino songs
Songs written by Gigi D'Agostino
Techno songs
Synth-pop ballads
Dutch Top 40 number-one singles
Number-one singles in Denmark
Number-one singles in Romania
Arista Records singles
ZYX Music singles